Volatile (foaled  March 20, 2016 ) is an American Thoroughbred racehorse and the winner of the 2020 Alfred G. Vanderbilt Handicap.

Career

Volatile's first race was on July 13th, 2019, at Ellis Park, where he came in first in a Maiden Special Weight race. He placed 2nd in an Allowance race on September 14th, 2019 at Churchill Downs, then began a three race winstreak.

He grabbed an Allowance race victory on November 3rd, 2019 at Churchill Downs, and then picked up an Allowance Optional Claiming victory at Oaklawn Park on April 24th, 2020.

Volatile picked up his first stakes win on June 6th, 2020, at the Aristides Stakes. He came in as the 1:2 favorite and came within two one-hundredths of a second off of the track record during the win, defeating Honest Mischief and winning $100,000.

On July 25th, 2020, at Saratoga, Volatile won the 2020 Alfred G. Vanderbilt Handicap. Volatile came into the four horse field as the heavy favorite at 2/5 odds and defeated Whitmore, who came in 2nd.

Pedigree

References

2016 racehorse births